SFR is a French telecommunications company.

SFR may also refer to:
 Società per le Strade Ferrate Romane, a 19th century Italian railway company 
 Société française radio-électrique, former French radio company
 Sodium-cooled fast reactor
 Special function register in a microprocessor
 Star forming region
 Strange Famous Records
 Swiss franc (SFr.)
 Single-family rental